The 1962 Lehigh Engineers football team was an American football team that represented Lehigh University during the 1962 NCAA College Division football season. Lehigh finished third in the Middle Atlantic Conference, University Division, and second in the Middle Three Conference.

In their first year under head coach Mike Cooley, the Engineers compiled a 3–6 record. Patrick Clark and Charles Gibson were the team captains.

Despite posting a losing overall record, Lehigh finished the year at .500 in conference play: a 2–2 record against MAC University Division opponents, and 1–1 against the Middle Three, losing to Rutgers and beating Lafayette.

Lehigh played its home games at Taylor Stadium on the university campus in Bethlehem, Pennsylvania.

Schedule

References

Lehigh
Lehigh
Lehigh Mountain Hawks football seasons
Lehigh Engineers football